Thiple Fork may refer to:

Triple Fork Drainage District, a drainage district in Champaign County, Illinois, U.S.
Triple Fork Mine, a former gold mine in Louisa County, Virginia, U.S.
Triple Fork (sanchakou), a traditional Chinese opera whose story forms part of the Generals of the Yang Family saga

See also
Three Forks (disambiguation)
Sanchakou (disambiguation)